Kentucky Route 1978 (KY 1978), known locally as Greendale Road, is an urban secondary state highway located entirely in northern Fayette County in East Central Kentucky. The  mainly traverses the northwestern outskirts of Lexington.

Route description 
KY 1978 originates Leestown Pike (US 421) in the northwestern outskirts of Lexington. It crosses Citation Boulevard before ending with a junction with KY 1977 in the Greendale neighborhood in north Lexington.

Major intersections

References

1978
1978